Staten Run is a stream in the U.S. state of West Virginia.

Staten Run was named after James Staten, a pioneer who was killed by indigenous Americans.

See also
List of rivers of West Virginia

References

Rivers of Kanawha County, West Virginia
Rivers of West Virginia